Stann Creek West is an electoral constituency in the Stann Creek District represented in the House of Representatives of the National Assembly of Belize.

Area Representatives

References 

 

Political divisions in Belize
Stann Creek West
Belizean House constituencies established in 1984